The French submarine Diamant was a  built for the French Navy in the mid-1930s. Laid down in July 1930, it was launched in May 1933 and commissioned in June 1934. Diamant was scuttled at Toulon on 27 November 1942 to prevent her capture by German forces, then refloated by Italian forces on 29 March 1943. On 22 June 1944, Diamant was bombed and sunk at Toulon by Allied aircraft.

Design
Propulsion while surfaced was provided by two  Normand-Vickers diesel motors and while submerged two  electric motors. The submarines electrical propulsion allowed it to attain speeds of 
 while submerged.

The Saphir-class submarines were constructed to be able to launch torpedoes and lay mines without surfacing. They were attached to the submarine's exterior under a hydrodynamic protection and were jettisoned with compressed air. The Saphir-class submarines also featured an automatic depth regulator that automatically flooded ballast tanks after mines were dropped to prevent the risk of the submarine surfacing in the middle of enemy waters.

See also 

 List of submarines of France
 French submarines of World War II

Citations

References 
 

Submarines of France
World War II submarines of France
Saphir-class submarines (1928)
Submarines sunk by aircraft
World War II shipwrecks in the Mediterranean Sea
1933 ships